"Extreme Ways" is a song by American electronica musician Moby.

The track is notably used at the conclusion of all five of the Bourne films. New versions of the song were each recorded for the third, fourth, and fifth films of the series: The Bourne Ultimatum, The Bourne Legacy, and Jason Bourne respectively. The song was also significantly featured in multiple seasons of the Korean game show, The Genius. The song was used on Fox animated series The Simpsons episode "Bart vs. Itchy & Scratchy".

Composition 
"Extreme Ways" samples the strings notes from Hugo Winterhalter's cover of "Everybody's Talkin'", and the drum beats of Melvin Bliss's "Synthetic Substitution".

Music video 
A video was made for the song, directed by Wayne Isham, which was later included on Moby's 18 B Sides + DVD compilation and the Bourne Identity "Explosive Extended Edition" DVD.

Bourne versions 
For the first two Bourne films, The Bourne Identity and The Bourne Supremacy, the original version of the song was used during the closing credits.

This version was recorded partly at Moby's home studio in Los Angeles and partly at Sony Pictures Studios. At Sony, Moby worked with a 110 piece orchestra with the help of composer James Newton Howard, who scored the film, and composer Joseph Trapanese. In addition to the lyrical track, the group also recorded a purely orchestral version of the song.

Moby recorded another version of the song, "Extreme Ways (Jason Bourne)", for the fifth film in the series, Jason Bourne, that was released on that film's soundtrack on July 29, 2016.

Track listings 

 CD single 
 "Extreme Ways" – 3:32
 "Love of Strings" – 6:11
 "Life's So Sweet" – 6:31
 "Extreme Ways"  – 3:31
 CD single - Limited Edition 
 "Extreme Ways" – 3:32
 Album excerpts – 1:55
 "Signs of Love"
 "Sunday (The Day Before My Birthday)"
 "In My Heart"
 "Jam for the Ladies"

 12-inch single 
 "Extreme Ways"  – 7:11
 "Extreme Ways"  – 11:37
 12-inch single 
 "Extreme Ways"  – 9:25
 "Extreme Ways"  – 8:36
 12-inch single 
 "Extreme Ways"  – 8:36
 "Extreme Ways"  – 9:25
 12-inch single 
 "Extreme Ways"  – 11:37
 "Extreme Ways"  – 6:27

Charts

Original version

"Bourne's Ultimatum" version

Release history

References

External links 
 

Moby songs
2002 singles
2002 songs
2007 singles
Jason Bourne
Music videos directed by Wayne Isham
Mute Records singles
Songs written by Moby
Songs written for films
V2 Records singles
Virgin Records singles